Amt Neuhardenberg is a former Amt ("collective municipality") in the district of Märkisch-Oderland, in Brandenburg, Germany. It was disbanded in January 2022. Its seat was in Neuhardenberg.

The Amt Neuhardenberg consisted of the following municipalities:
Gusow-Platkow
Märkische Höhe
Neuhardenberg

Demography

References

Neuhardenberg
Märkisch-Oderland